Lac d'Ambléon is a lake at Ambléon in the Ain department of France.

External links
   

Ambleon